A maternity den, in the animal kingdom, is a lair where the mother gives birth and nurtures the young, when they are in a vulnerable life stage. While such dens are typically subterranean, they may also be snow caves or simply beneath rock ledges. Characteristically there is an entrance, and optionally an exit corridor, in addition to a principal chamber.

Examples

Polar bear 
The polar bear (Ursus maritimus) creates a maternity den either in an earthen subterranean or in a snow cave. On the Hudson Bay Plain in Manitoba, Canada, many of these subterranean dens are situated in the Wapusk National Park, from which bears migrate to the Hudson Bay when the ice pack forms.  The maternity den is the bear's shelter for most of the winter.

Wild dogs 
Pack members may guard the maternity den used by the alpha female; such is the case with the African wild dog, Lycaon pictus.

Brown hyena 
The brown hyena (Parahyaena brunnea) makes use of  maternity dens as a means of nurturing and protecting their cubs. These dens are located in coastal or inland regions, most of them being caverns with narrow entrances. The brown hyena also collects bones and stores them within or around the entrance of these dens.

Red fox 
The red fox (Vulpes vulpes) also creates maternity dens. After mating, foxes make a maternity den for raising their offspring. Most often, the mother and father will find and enlarge an old woodchuck burrow. Sometimes, a hollow log, streambank, rock pile, cave, or dense shrub will play the role as a den. The den is usually chosen at a place where there is raised ground so the red foxes can see all around. The main entrance will be approximately three feet wide, and the den will have one or two escape holes. The den is lined with grass and dry leaves.

See also 
 Pregnancy
 Burrow

References 

Ethology
Shelters built or used by animals